Jong-Ok Shin  (born 3 April 1976) was a Korean English language student living in Bournemouth, United Kingdom. She was murdered in the early hours of the morning of 12 July 2002 as she walked home from a night out with friends. Omar Benguit was arrested for the murder of Jong-Ok Shin on 22 August 2002, by Dorset Police, and was later convicted after a second re-trial in 2005 at Winchester Crown Court. Benguit was sentenced to life imprisonment and has had two failed attempts at the Court of Appeal. His first appeal was in 2005 and second was in 2014. He now remains at a category A prison in England and still maintains his innocence.

Murder of Jong-Ok Shin 

On Friday 12 July 2002, at around 2:50 am, 26-year-old Jong-Ok Shin was murdered on Malmesbury Park Road, Richmond Park, Bournemouth. It is known that the Korean student was walking home following a night out with friends at a popular student wine bar, The Bank. Shin was discovered by residents of a nearby house who called for an ambulance. Shin later died in hospital as a result of three stab wounds to the back, with an approximately 14–15 cm blade. The knife used during the attack has never been recovered.

Despite the police responding promptly to the report of the attack, there was no forensic evidence obtained at the scene. Residents in the street reported that the night was quiet, although one witness said he could hear an argument between a man with a foreign accent and a woman followed by low groans from the woman.  Other residents reported hearing a vehicle with a loud exhaust making a U-turn and driving off. The car however was traced to another resident living in the street.

Omar Benguit was arrested on 22 August, almost six weeks after the murder, after being named as the killer by a police informant. Beverly Brown, a heroin addict and prostitute, claimed that she was with Benguit and two other male heroin addicts on the night of the murder. The two other males were later named as Nicholas Gbadamosi and Delroy Woolry. Brown says she had been forced by the males to drive them around, when Benguit told her to pull over near to Shin, who was walking along Malmesbury Park Road alone. Brown alleges that Benguit approached Shin and asked her to come party with them and when she refused, he stabbed her.

Trials

First Trial 

After being charged with the murder of Jong-Ok Shin, Omar Benguit and Nicholas Gbadamosi stood trial. Benguit for the murder of Shin and Gbadamosi for assisting Benguit. Both of the males also stood trial for the rape of Beverly Brown, occurring later in the morning of 12 July.

It is worth noting that Delroy Woolry was named by Beverley Brown as also being in the car that night, and being an active participant in the gang rape of her later that morning.   However, Woolry was deported back to his country of birth Jamaica, allegedly because his visa had expired. Woolry has never been on trial for these charges as, despite the serious nature of Beverley Brown's allegations, he was never extradited.

The jury cleared Gbadamosi of the rape charges. The Jury of the first trial failed to deliver a verdict of either Benguit murdering Shin or Gbadamosi assisting him. The Jury had also failed to reach a verdict on the rape charge against Benguit.

Second Trial 

In 2004, a re-trial was held on the basis of the charges which the jury had been unable to reach a verdict on in the first trial. During this trial, it came to light that Gbadamosi had in fact been caught on a speed camera during the time the alleged rape took place. 

However, at the end of the trial, the jury only acquitted Benguit of the rape charge and Gbadamosi of assisting Benguit in the murder of Shin. Whilst remanded in custody for the duration of both trials, Benguit had suffered a series of brutal attacks.

In spite of the lack of forensic evidence and CCTV, and the reliability of the accounts of the main witness being questioned with the discovery of the speed camera footage, the jury again failed to reach a verdict for Benguit regarding the murder of Shin.

Third Retrial 

With Gbadamosi acquitted, Benguit was the only suspect left. In order to secure this third re-trial, permission had to be sought from the director of public prosecutions. 

The trial took place in 2005 and eventually, Benguit was found guilty of the murder of Shin.

All the other witnesses that the prosecution relied on were known drug addicts and sex workers as was Benguit, who was a problematic heroin user. All evidence from these witnesses was purely circumstantial.

It was at the conclusion of this trial that Mr Benguit was found guilty of murder by the jury and sentenced to life imprisonment by Mrs Justice Hallett at Winchester Crown Court.

Appeals

First Appeal 

On 12 July 2005, three years after the murder, Benguit's first appeal of his conviction took place in the Court of Appeal. The first ground of appeal, made by Anthony Donne, was that the ruling to allow a second retrial was wrong. The second retrial was allowed on the grounds that it was in the public's interest to obtain a conviction, however his defence argued that it was unjust. The second ground for appeal was the allowance of evidence from two witnesses who had apparently at some point in the past seen Benguit carrying a knife, similar to that used in the murder. The defence also wished to draw attention to the fact that Beverly Brown's evidence should not have been admissible in the second retrial as it had been proved to be unreliable. She had given a number of different versions about the offence, including lying in her first and second statements on her own admission. Donne argued that due to the lack of forensic evidence and reliance on hearsay evidence of admitted drug addicts, the ruling to allow a second retrial was wrong.

The appeal was dismissed as the Court of Appeal concluded that the decision made by the judge, Mrs Justice Hallett, to allow a second retrial was correct. The process of the second retrial was not unjust nor prejudicial.

Anthony Donne QC stood as Benguit's counsel in the appeal but had not represented him at any previous trials.

Second Appeal 

In 2012 the Criminal Cases Review Commission referred Benguit's case to the Court of Appeal, following a successful application to the review body, and on 9 April 2014 the appeal took place. The evidence used by Benguit's defence team was that Beverly Brown, the lead witness, had appeared on the ITV show the Jeremy Kyle Show, giving a different account of the crime than what she gave in the original trials. The credibility of Brown was tested before the jury, and it was concluded that although Brown exaggerated her account of the crime, the essence of the crime never changed and the appearance was not done for financial gain. The judges concluded that Brown's account had "significant circumstantial support" from other witnesses.

It was also argued by the defence that an Italian man, Danilo Restivo, convicted of two other murders who was living in the area at the time, was a more likely suspect for the crime. It was suggested that the murder of Shin resembled similarities between Restivo's other murders. Restivo murdered Elisa Claps on 12 September 1993 and Heather Barnett, who was killed in her home on 12 November 2002. However, the judges argued that there were numerous differences between the murder of Miss Claps and Mrs Barnett, and that of Miss Shin.
The court did recognise that the case was not supported by any forensic evidence, however it was argued that there was ‘significant circumstantial support’ against Benguit. This included previous convictions for carrying a knife, blood found on his clothing after the crime and an apparent confession made by Benguit to stabbing a student in Charminster. Lady Justice Rafferty, Mr Justice Cranston and Mr Justice Stewart dismissed the appeal.

Beverley Brown 
Beverly Dawn Brown is perceived as a principal witness in the murder of Jong-Ok Shin, after accusing Benguit, Gbadamosi and Woolry of the murder. In her statement to the police, she described how she had been driving the three males that night when they had asked her to pull over. She then stated that Omar had exited the vehicle, stabbed Shin and returned to her car. She was subsequently interviewed several times regarding the murder of Miss Shin, apparently with the intent to find information to be used in the conviction trial of Omar Benguit. Brown was known to be a drug addict, which may partially explain her changing story of what allegedly happened that night, and her serious allegations against Benguit and the other two men. A relevant example of a misleading statement provided by Beverly is her appearance at the Jeremy Kyle's TV show, when she revealed an idea of seeing Omar Benguit performing/executing the murder act – this information significantly differed from that given during the trials where she said she had not witnessed the murder of Shin. Brown also accused Benguit and Gbadamosi of raping her in the early hours of the morning after the murder, however both were found not guilty of this in the second trial.

Danilo Restivo 
During the second appeal, Benguit's defence suggested that the true murderer of Oki-Shin was Danilo Restivo, who has since been found guilty of two murders. In May 2002, Restivo arrived in England from Italy and moved to Bournemouth. On 12 November 2002, Heather Barnett was found dead in her home as result of a head injury. There had been an attempt to remove her head, resulting in a bad injury to her neck. There was also a lock of hair placed in her right hand, however the hair found was not from the victim. In March 2010, the body of Elisa Claps, who had disappeared in 1993, was found in a church in Italy. In addition, a clump of hair had been cut from her head and placed in her hand shortly after her death. The Italian investigators found DNA and other evidence that indicated that Restivo was the murderer of Claps. Following the discovery of DNA linking Restivo to the murder of Heather Barnett, he was put on trial for murder and got sentenced to a whole life sentence in 2011. On appeal, his sentence was reduced to 40 years. Restivo is currently in prison in England, and unlikely to ever be released from custody as he would be deported to Italy immediately upon release to serve a life sentence for the murder of Elisa Claps.

However, Restivo has also been accused of committing the murder of Jong-Ok Shin on 12 July 2002 in Bournemouth. A clump of hair was found at the very spot where the victim had been stabbed, which threw suspicion onto Restivo. Just before the 2nd appeal in 2014 Dorset police produced a witness statement for the first time from a woman who had apparently been identified from the hair and who stated that she had lived opposite the crime scene. She recalled using a mobile hairdresser 12 years earlier and implied that she may have deposited the clump of hair in the rubbish bins which somehow was blown to the spot where the victim was stabbed. Other reasons that may link Restivo to the murder of Jong-Ok Shin include the finding of a balaclava in Restivo's possession. Shin described her murderer to have been wearing a mask before she was taken to hospital. Furthermore, an identical knife to that used to attack Shin was found in Restivo's bag when he was arrested in 2004 for another offence. Finally a man resembling Restivo carrying a satchel was seen on CCTV near the crime scene at six minutes past the time of the murder. This evidence was not relied on by Benguit's barrister Rag Chand who was dismissed from the case by Benguit's family following the court of appeal decision.

Legal representatives 
 Giovanni Di Stefano is an Italian British businessman who was convicted of deception, fraud and money laundering in 2013. He represented Omar before the second appeal and made the application to the Criminal Cases Review Commission.
 Barrister Rag Chand represented Benguit in the 2014 appeal.
 Marika Henneberg is a senior lecturer at the Institute of Criminal Justice Studies (ICJS), University of Portsmouth, UK, since 2009 Between 2009 and 2014, Marika co-directed the Innocence Project at the University of Portsmouth with Dr Damian Carney. The project was run jointly by the ICJS and the Law School. In January 2015, the project became part of the newly established Criminal Justice Clinic, which consists of Marika as the leader and a board of advisors.  Marika  started working on Omar's case in 2015, with the Criminal Justice Clinic which examines alleged wrongful convictions and miscarriages of justice cases.

External links
 Omar Benguit Official Website

References

2002 in England
2002 murders in the United Kingdom
July 2002 crimes
July 2002 events in the United Kingdom
Crime in Dorset
Female murder victims
History of Bournemouth
Murder in England
Korean people murdered abroad